The BMW Championship may refer to either of two golf tournaments:

BMW Championship (PGA Tour)
BMW PGA Championship on the European Tour; known as the BMW Championship from 2005 to 2006